Saheed Anurup Chandra Mahavidyalaya, established in 1991, is an undergraduate college in Burul, West Bengal, India. It is affiliated with the University of Calcutta.

Departments
Arts and Commerce conferring B.A.(General & Honours), B.Com.(General) and B.Sc.(General & Honours) Degrees

Bengali
English
History
Geography
Political Science
Philosophy
Economics
Education
Commerce
Computer Science
Mathematics

See also 
List of colleges affiliated to the University of Calcutta
Education in India
Education in West Bengal

References

External links
Saheed Anurup Chandra Mahavidyalaya

Educational institutions established in 1991
University of Calcutta affiliates
Universities and colleges in South 24 Parganas district
1991 establishments in West Bengal